Lieutenant General Anil Kumar Bhatt, PVSM, UYSM, AVSM, SM, VSM was the Military Secretary of the Indian Army. Prior to this, he served as the 47th Commander, XV Corps of the Indian Army between 1 February 2018 and 7 February 2019. Prior to this he was the Director General of Military operations for one year including during the Doklam crisis in 2017.During his tenure as Corps Commander maximum terrorists were neutralized in comparison to the last one decade.

Early life and education 
Bhatt was born in Khatwaad village of Tehri Garhwal district, in Uttarakhand. He is alumnus of St. George's College, Mussoorie; Indian Military Academy, Dehradun and Staff College, Camberley, United Kingdom.

Career 
Bhatt was commissioned into 9 Gorkha Rifles (Chindits) in 1981. He has served three times in Jammu and Kashmir. He has held several important posts including Commander of 21 Mountain Division (Rangiya); Director General of Military Operations (DGMO);  Additional Director General of CAB (Complaint and Advisory Board) at Army HQ and an instructor at Commando School, Belgaum. He is also the Colonel of the Regiment for 9 Gorkha Rifles and has represented India as the deputy Force Provost Marshal in Lebanon.

During his career of 36 years, he has been awarded the Uttam Yudh Seva Medal in 2019 for many successful operations, including elimination of the highest number of militants — 259 — in a year over a decade. Ati Vishisht Seva Medal (2015), Sena Medal, Vishisht Seva Medal for his service.

He was made the first Director General of Indian Space Association inaugurated on October 11, 2021.

Honours and decorations

References 

Indian Army officers
Indian generals
Living people
People from Uttarakhand
Military personnel from Uttarakhand
Year of birth missing (living people)
Recipients of the Param Vishisht Seva Medal
Recipients of the Ati Vishisht Seva Medal
Recipients of the Uttam Yudh Seva Medal
Recipients of the Vishisht Seva Medal
Recipients of the Sena Medal